Jokar may refer to:

Jowkar, Iran
Abdolreza Jokar, Iranian Paralympian athlete
Masoud Mostafa-Jokar, Iranian wrestler
Meisam Mostafa-Jokar, Iranian wrestler